The Society of Makeup Artists was a professional organization, based in the US. Hollywood cinema credits following a makeup artist member would be designated with SMA (similar to MPSE or ACE).

Among the presidents of the organization was John Chambers, of Planet of the Apes movie fame. Other members included Gordon Bau and David Lawrence.

See also
 Make-Up Artists and Hair Stylists Guild

References

External links

Entertainment industry societies
Makeup